Samuel Richmond Cox (13 April 1924 – 2 August 2015) was a Scottish footballer who played for Queen's Park, Third Lanark, Dundee, Rangers, East Fife, Scotland and the Scottish League XI.

Career

Club
Cox was born in Darvel, Ayrshire, Scotland. He initially played for Queen's Park, Third Lanark and Dundee during World War II, joined Rangers in 1946 and played in the Scottish Football League when it recommenced play after the war.

A defender, Cox made his league debut for Rangers in a 4–2 win over Motherwell at the start of the 1946–47 season. He made a total of 13 league appearances in his first season, including a 4–1 win over Hamilton Academical in the last match, as Rangers beat Hibernian to clinch the League title. In the following season, 1947–48, Cox was an ever-present as Rangers finished second to Hibs in the league, but won the Scottish Cup after a 1–0 replay win over Morton. He also netted his first goal during the season, scoring in a 2–1 win over Clyde at Ibrox.

In season 1948–49, Rangers became the first club in Scottish football history to win the treble and Cox played an important role, playing in 43 of the 44 matches. Rangers retained the League title in season 1949–50, and Cox was once again an ever-present as Hibernian were edged out by one point. Rangers also retained the Scottish Cup, beating East Fife 3–0 at Hampden.

1950–51 was a disappointment for Rangers as they failed to register a trophy for the first time in five seasons. More disappointment followed as they were once again left trophyless in 1951–52, however Cox continued to be an important member of both the Rangers and Scotland teams. In season 1952–53, Rangers returned to domestic success as they won the League and Cup double with Cox featuring in 37 of the 48 matches; however, he missed out on the Scottish Cup final win over Aberdeen.

Cox played in 44 games out of 47 in season 1953–54, however Rangers failed to win a trophy and finished fourth in the League. 1954–55 was his last season at Rangers as he made only 15 first-team appearances. He played his final match for the club in a 2–1 defeat to Aberdeen on 19 February 1955. Cox made a total of 370 appearances for Rangers.

After his Rangers career, Cox had a spell with East Fife before emigrating to Canada in 1958. He played in the National Soccer League for Toronto Ulster United in 1958. In 1958, he served as a player-coach for Toronto Sparta and also for Stratford Fischers in 1960. He also played for the Ontario All-Stars against West Bromwich Albion in 1959.

International
Cox won 25 caps for Scotland and 13 caps for the Scottish League XI. He made his international debut on 23 May 1948 in a 3–0 loss to France as a late replacement for Billy Campbell whose boots had broken; due to the unexpected change, some records incorrectly attributed this to Charlie Cox, a distant relative who also played at a high standard but never appeared at international level. In 1954 Cox played his last match for Scotland; he captained the team at Hampden in a 4–2 defeat by England in front of 134,544 spectators.

He was also related to Jackie Cox (who served Hamilton Academical, among others, as both player and manager).

Death
As of 2014, Cox was living in a nursing home in Stratford, Ontario. He died in August 2015, aged 91 years old, after a short illness.

Career statistics

International appearances

See also
List of Scotland national football team captains

References

1924 births
2015 deaths
Scottish Football League players
Scottish footballers
Scotland international footballers
Scottish Junior Football Association players
Darvel F.C. players
Glenafton Athletic F.C. players
Rangers F.C. players
Queen's Park F.C. players
East Fife F.C. players
Third Lanark A.C. players
Dundee F.C. players
Gordon Highlanders soldiers
British Army personnel of World War II
Scottish Football League representative players
Scotland wartime international footballers
Scottish expatriate footballers
Expatriate soccer players in Canada
Scottish expatriate sportspeople in Canada
Scottish emigrants to Canada
Toronto Ulster United players
Association football fullbacks
Footballers from East Ayrshire
Canadian National Soccer League players
Canadian National Soccer League coaches